Kafubu (or Kafuvu) is a small village on the eastern tip of the Caprivi Strip, across from Kasane, Botswana on the Chobe River in Namibia. With a population of between 200 and 300, Kafubu villagers are mostly Subiya cultivators and fishermen. The village can only be reached by boat, with a small Namibian customs office located nearby. Several large baobab trees dot the area. Most homes in Kafubu are made of reeds and dirt. Tourists visiting Kafubu from nearby Kasane and Chobe National Park can tour the village and buy crafts.

References 

North-West District (Botswana)
Populated places in Botswana
Botswana–Namibia border crossings